The marbled whiptail (Aspidoscelis marmoratus) is a species of lizard found in the United States, in southern New Mexico and Texas, and in northern Mexico, in Coahuila, Chihuahua and Durango.

Description 
The marbled whiptail grows from 8 to 12 inches in length. It is grey or black overall in color with 4 to 8 yellow or white stripes, often with dark mottling, giving it a marbled appearance. Their underside is white or pale yellow, with a peach coloration on the throat.  They are slender bodied, with long tails.

Behavior 
Like most other species of whiptail lizards, the marbled whiptail is diurnal and insectivorous. It is wary, energetic, and fast moving, darting for cover if approached. Its preferred habitat is semiarid, sandy areas with sparse vegetation, or the open edges of wooded areas. Breeding takes place in the spring, with up to four eggs laid sometime in the month of May. The eggs hatch in six to eight weeks. A second clutch of eggs is occasionally laid in mid summer. Hatchlings look much like the adults, except they have bright blue colored tails.

Subspecies 
There are two recognized subspecies of A. marmoratus:

Aspidoscelis marmoratus marmoratus (Baird & Girard, 1852)
Aspidoscelis marmoratus reticuloriens (Vance, 1978)

References 

Herps of Texas: Cnemidophorus marmoratus

Aspidoscelis
Fauna of the Southwestern United States
Reptiles of the United States
Reptiles of Mexico
Reptiles described in 1852
Taxa named by Spencer Fullerton Baird
Taxa named by Charles Frédéric Girard